The 2022 Tallinn Open event was a professional women's tennis tournament played on indoor hard courts at the Forus Tennis Centre and held between 26 September and 2 October 2022. It was the first tournament in the Women's Tennis Association (WTA)'s history to be held in Tallinn, Estonia and was organized as a WTA 250 event on the 2022 WTA Tour.

The event was held for the first time, however, it was one of the six tournaments that were given single-year WTA 250 licenses in September and October 2022 due to the cancellation of tournaments in China during the 2022 season because of the ongoing COVID-19 pandemic, as well as the suspension of tournaments in China following former WTA player Peng Shuai's allegation of sexual assault against a Chinese government official.

Champions

Singles 

  Barbora Krejčíková def.  Anett Kontaveit 6–2, 6–3

This is Krejčíková's first title of the year and fourth of her career.

Doubles 

  Lyudmyla Kichenok /  Nadiia Kichenok def.  Nicole Melichar-Martinez /  Laura Siegemund 7–5, 4–6, [10–7]

Points and prize money

Point distribution

Prize money 

1Qualifiers prize money is also the Round of 32 prize money.
*per team

Singles main-draw entrants

Seeds

† Rankings are as of 19 September 2022.

Other entrants
The following players received wildcards into the main draw:
  Elena Malõgina
  Karolína Muchová
  Maileen Nuudi

The following player received entry into the singles main draw with a special ranking:
  Laura Siegemund

The following players received entry from the qualifying draw:
  Ysaline Bonaventure
  Katie Boulter
  Viktorija Golubic
  Viktória Kužmová
  Linda Nosková
  Jessika Ponchet

The following player received entry as a lucky loser: 
  Mirjam Björklund

Withdrawals
  Anhelina Kalinina → replaced by  Wang Xiyu
  Elena Rybakina → replaced by  Mirjam Björklund
  Clara Tauson → replaced by  Wang Xinyu
  Alison Van Uytvanck → replaced by  Jaqueline Cristian

Doubles main-draw entrants

Seeds 

 1 Rankings as of 19 September 2022.

Other entrants
The following pairs received wildcards into the doubles main draw:
  Valentini Grammatikopoulou /  Daniela Vismane
  Elena Malõgina /  Maileen Nuudi

Withdrawals 
 Before the tournament
  Vivian Heisen /  Monica Niculescu → replaced by  Jaqueline Cristian /  Vivian Heisen

References

External links 
 WTA tournament profile

2022 WTA Tour
Women's sports competitions in Estonia
Sports competitions in Tallinn
Sport in Tallinn
Tallinn Open
Tallinn Open
Tallinn Open